Belemnia inaurata is a moth of the subfamily Arctiinae. It was described by Sulzer in 1776. It is found in Mexico, Guatemala, Honduras, Panama and Colombia.

Subspecies
Belemnia inaurata inaurata (Mexico, Guatemala, Honduras, Panama)
Belemnia inaurata rezia Druce, 1896 (Colombia)

References

Arctiini
Moths described in 1776
Taxa named by Johann Heinrich Sulzer